The decree Haec sancta synodus ("This holy synod"), also called Haec sancta, was promulgated by the fifth session of the Council of Constance on April 6, 1415. It contains a section on the question of whether the Pope is above an ecumenical council or, conversely, such a council is above the Pope. The question is related to papal primacy, papal supremacy and conciliarism. 

The decree played an essential role in shaping conciliarism.

Excerpt on supremacy of an ecumenical council 

The section concerning the supremacy of a council over the pope and any clergy member reads:

Opinions on the decree 

In theology, "[t]he range of interpretations [of Haec sancta] is large. It ranges from the qualification of the decree as a dogma via the so-called 'necessity theory', to the thesis of minimizing its theological content to that of a legal decree, not a doctrinal statement, which is mainly due to the way the language of the text is opened up".

See also 

 Frequens
 Conciliarity

References

Further reading 

 
 
 
 
 

Western Schism
15th-century Christianity
History of the Catholic Church
1415 works